Stationhouse may refer to:

 Stationhouse (firefighting), a structure or other area set aside for storage of fire extinguishing equipment
 Stationhouse (police), a building which serves as the headquarters of a police force or unit which serves a specific district
 Station building, a building which serves as the structure housing a railroad stop